Mangalpady  is a Grama Panchayat in Kasaragod district, Kerala. Uppala is the major town in this panchayat.

According to census 2011,  it has a population of 48,441 in an area of 36.3 square km. With a population density of 1332.5 per square km, it is one of the densely populated panchayat in Kerala.

Villages in Mangalpady panchayat
 Mangalpady
 Bekoor
 Heroor
 Ichilangod
 Kodibail
 Kubanoor
 Mulinja

Census towns in Mangalpady panchayat

 Uppala
 Bandiyod
 Mangalpady
 Shiriya

Uppala Municipality Plan

If Uppala municipality is carved out from the Mangalpady and Manjeshwaram  panchayat by adding the following to Uppala Census town:
 Census towns - Mangalpady, Shiriya, Bangra Manjeshwar, Hosabettu, Manjeshwar
 villages - Kodibail, Mulinja, Majibail and Badaje

Uppala Municipality will have a population of 66,431 in an area of 41.66 sq.km. The population density of the municipality will be around 1,600 per sq.km.

Demographics
 India census, Mangalpady had a population of 48468.

Languages
This locality is an essentially multi-lingual region. The people speak Malayalam, Tulu, Kannada, Urdu, Beary bashe and Konkani. Migrant workers also speak Hindi and Tamil languages.

Administration
This village is part of Manjeswaram assembly constituency which is again part of Kasaragod (Lok Sabha constituency)

Transportation
Local roads have access to National Highway No.66 which connects to Mangalore in the north and Trivandrum in the south.  The nearest railway station is Uppala on Mangalore-Palakkad line. There is an airport at Mangalore.

References

Manjeshwar area